Henry Leeson (20 July 1908 – 25 June 1950) was an Australian cricketer. He played in fourteen first-class matches for Queensland between 1929 and 1935.

See also
 List of Queensland first-class cricketers

References

External links
 

1908 births
1950 deaths
Australian cricketers
Queensland cricketers
Cricketers from Queensland